Metopoceras is a genus of moths of the family Noctuidae.

Species
 Metopoceras albarracina Hampson, 1918
 Metopoceras canroberti Oberthür, 1918
 Metopoceras delicata (Staudinger, 1898)
 Metopoceras driss Rungs, 1952
 Metopoceras duseutrei (Oberthür, 1922)
 Metopoceras felicina (Donzel, 1844)
 Metopoceras khalildja Oberthür, 1884
 Metopoceras kneuckeri (Rebel, 1903)
 Metopoceras philbyi Wiltshire, 1980
 Metopoceras omar (Oberthür, 1887)
 Metopoceras solituda (Brandt, 1938)

References
Natural History Museum Lepidoptera genus database
Metopoceras at funet